Konrad Martin Fritiof Svensson (2 June 1896 – 5 March 1961) was a featherweight Greco-Roman wrestler from Sweden who competed at the 1920 and 1924 Summer Olympics. He won a bronze medal in 1920 and finished fifth in 1924. Svensson won a world title in Stockholm in 1922.

References

External links
 

1896 births
1961 deaths
Olympic wrestlers of Sweden
Wrestlers at the 1920 Summer Olympics
Wrestlers at the 1924 Summer Olympics
Swedish male sport wrestlers
Olympic bronze medalists for Sweden
Olympic medalists in wrestling
Medalists at the 1920 Summer Olympics
World Wrestling Championships medalists
20th-century Swedish people